Dancing Queen is an Indian dance reality competition television series which aired on Colors TV from 12 December 2008 to 7 March 2009.

Concept
The series consists of 10 female celebrities (film and television) who are paired with an aspirant who shall be her partner and protégé throughout the show and whom she will have to mentor. Each week, these jodis will perform before the judges to receive their scores and the audience votes through SMS.

Cast

Host
Shabbir Ahluwalia

Judges
Jeetendra
Hema Malini
Liza Malik

Contestants
Following is a list of contestants with their partners:

 Anita Hassanandani - Sonali Nirantar
 Barkha Bisht Sengupta - Taranjeet Kaur
 Bruna Abdullah - Priya Gamre
 Deepshikha Nagpal - Liza Malik
 Ishita Arun - Anjali Azad
 Meghna Naidu - Moon Das
 Mink Brar- Ada
 Sambhavana Sheth - Shamaayal (WINNER)
 Sanober Kabir - Mrigya Saklani
 Shweta Menon - Bhoomika Zaver
 Shweta Salve - Aashnay (WILDCARD)

Elimination chart

References

External links
Dancing Queen Official Site

Colors TV original programming
2008 Indian television series debuts
Indian reality television series
Indian dance television shows